Dafina Memedov (born 21 February 1990) is a Kosovan-born Albanian former footballer who played as a midfielder. She has been a member of the Albania women's national team.

Early life
Memedov was born in Kosovo and raised in Sweden. She is of Albanian descent.

Club career
Memedov has played for IFK Norrköping DFK in Sweden.

See also
List of Albania women's international footballers

References

1990 births
Living people
Albanian women's footballers
Women's association football midfielders
Albania women's international footballers
Kosovan women's footballers
Kosovan people of Albanian descent
Sportspeople of Albanian descent
Kosovan emigrants to Sweden
Naturalized citizens of Sweden
Swedish women's footballers
Kristianstads DFF players
Linköpings FC players
Damallsvenskan players
Swedish people of Albanian descent